Suniel Shetty (born Sunil V. Shetty; 11 August 1961) is an Indian actor, film producer, television personality and entrepreneur who is predominantly active in Hindi films he has also worked in Tamil, Telugu, English,
Marathi, Malayalam and Kannada films. In a career spanning almost 30 years, he has acted in over 100 films.

He is the owner of the production house Popcorn Entertainment Private Limited. He has produced a number of films including Khel – No Ordinary Game, Rakht and Bhagam Bhag, under the banner of Popcorn Motion Pictures.

Early life 
Suniel Shetty was born in a Tulu speaking Bunt family on 11 August 1961 in Mulki, Mangalore.

Career 

He made his debut in Hindi films in 1992 at the age of 31 with Balwaan, opposite Divya Bharti. The film helped him to retain his position in Bollywood as an action hero. He went on to play the protagonist in various successful movies such as Balwaan (1992), Waqt Hamara Hai (1993), Pehchaan (1993), Dilwale (1994), Anth (1994), Mohra (1994), Gopi Kishan (1994), Hum Hain Bemisaal (1994), Surakshaa(1995), Raghuveer (1995), Takkar(1995), Krishna (1996), Sapoot (1996), Rakshak (1996), Border (1997), Judge Mujrim (1997), Bhai (1997), Qahar (1997),  Vinashak (1998) and Hu Tu Tu (1999). He was one of the highest paid Bollywood actors in the 1990s. He was involved primarily in action films throughout the 1990s, playing the male protagonist in most of the movies he acted in during the decade. From early 2000, he mainly appeared in multi-starrers in across genres. He also starred opposite Isha Koppikar in Arjun Rampal's debut movie Pyaar Ishq Aur Mohabbat (2001). Hera Pheri (2000), Dhadkan (2000), Jungle (2000), Yeh Teraa Ghar Yeh Meraa Ghar (2001), Main Hoon Na (2004), Phir Hera Pheri (2006), and Red Alert: The War Within (2010). In 2014, he changed the spelling of his name from Sunil to Suniel for numerological reasons. Shootout at Lokhandwala (2007), One Two Three (2008) and De Dana Dan (2009). He even played negative roles in movies, including Dhadkan (2000), Khel – No Ordinary Game (2003), Baaz: A Bird in Danger (2003), Main Hoon Na (2004), Rudraksh (2004), Cash, No Problem and A Gentleman (2017).

Along with Mukesh Chhabra, he has also started an online casting company, F...the Couch (FTC). Shetty is the captain of the Mumbai Heroes cricket team in Celebrity Cricket League and owns the restaurants Mischief Dining Bar and Club H2O, in Mumbai. He has also featured as a host for India's leading fitness reality shows Biggest Loser Jeetega and India's Asli Champion Hai Dam?.

In 2005, on the eve of the former Prime Minister Rajiv Gandhi's 61st birth anniversary, the Mumbai Pradesh Youth Congress honoured Shetty with the Rajiv Gandhi award.

Shetty won the Filmfare Award for Best Villain in 2001 for Dhadkan. In 2009, Shetty bagged South Asian International Film Festival's Best Actor Award for his role in Naxalites based Indian movie Red Alert.

The actor has entrepreneurial ventures as well. Shetty produced films such as Khel – No Ordinary Game, Rakht and Bhagam Bhag under the banner of Popcorn Motion Pictures.

The FTC is a digital platform that discovers new talent in Bollywood provides a platform to new artists to make a place for themselves in Bollywood. Apart from being part of this project, Shetty has also been actively involved in realty and restaurant business.

Shetty also acted in his second Tamil film Darbar with Rajinikanth in 2020.

In 2021, Shetty appeared in the Sanjay Gupta's gangster drama film Mumbai Saga, which was released on 19 March. He was last seen in Kiran Korrapati directed Ghani, which released on 8 April.

Other work

Fittr 
In 2019, Suneil invested an undisclosed amount in a Pune-based online health and fitness start up Fittr. Its founder Jitendra Chouksey launched Fittr in January 2016 as a community on Facebook to address the challenges in the fitness industry, Fittr now claims of over 100,000 fitness transformations, and a highly engaged community of 550,000 members. The platforms mobile app, has been downloaded more than 500,000 times since September 2018.

Television 
Shetty has appeared as a host for India's leading fitness reality shows Biggest Loser Jeetega on Sahara One. and
India's Asli Champion Hai dam? on &TV.

Restaurant 
The actor owns Mischief Dining Bar and Club H2O, in Mumbai. Both the places are running successfully. He co-owns the water adventure park attached to cafe H2O. He closed down Mischief Bar in 2010, and instead opened a new restaurant called Little Italy. The restaurant was first owned by his father when it was an Udupi restaurant, Suniel then changed the restaurant into a bar, and then back into a restaurant with the different name with his father's blessings.

Celebrity Cricket League 
Suniel Shetty is captain of the Mumbai Heroes cricket team in the Celebrity Cricket League. He is also the co-founder of Ferit Cricket Bash that was launched in December 2018.

Hiru Golden Film Awards 
Suniel Shetty was participant in the Hiru Golden Film Awards 2014 and 2016 in Sri Lanka as a special guest.

R House 
He started his luxury furniture and home lifestyle store in Mumbai, Worli in 2013 with his wife Mana.

Personal life 

Since 1991 he is married to Mana Shetty (née Monisha Kadri), a businesswoman, designer and social activist born to a Gujarati Muslim architect and a Punjabi Hindu social activist, and they have two children, a daughter Athiya Shetty and a son Ahan Shetty. 

Both Athiya and Ahan have made their acting debuts respectively, Athiya in the film Hero (2015) and Ahan in Sajid Nadiadwala's film Tadap (2021), the Hindi remake of Telugu film RX 100. Mana runs an NGO for under-privileged kids.

Suniel Shetty’s daughter Athiya Shetty married Indian cricketer KL Rahul on January 23, 2023, in Shetty’s palace Lonavala.

Shetty has a black belt in kickboxing. He owns clothing boutiques as well as restaurants specialising in Udupi cuisine.

Filmography

Accolades 
Winner

 2001: Filmfare Award for Best Villain for Dhadkan
 2001: Zee Cine Award for Best Supporting Actor for Dhadkan
 2005: GIFA Award for Best Villain for Main Hoon Na
 2011: Stardust Award for Best Actor (Critics) for Red Alert: The War Within

Nominated

 1995: Filmfare Award for Best Supporting Actor for Dilwale
 1998: Filmfare Award for Best Supporting Actor for Border
 1998: Screen Award for Best Supporting Actor for Border
 2001: Filmfare Award for Best Supporting Actor for Refugee
 2001: IIFA Award for Best Supporting Actor for Refugee
 2001: IIFA Award for Best Villain for Dhadkan
 2004: IIFA Award for Best Supporting Actor for Qayamat: City Under Threat
 2005: Filmfare Award for Best Villain for Main Hoon Na
 2005: IIFA Award for Best Villain for Main Hoon Na
 2021: SIIMA Award for Best Actor in a Negative Role – Tamil for Darbar

References

External links 

 
 
 

1961 births
Indian male film actors
Living people
Film producers from Karnataka
People from Dakshina Kannada district
Indian television presenters
Indian male comedians
Male actors in Hindi cinema
Mangaloreans
Tulu people
Male actors from Karnataka
Male actors in Kannada television
Indian male television actors
20th-century Indian male actors
21st-century Indian male actors
Filmfare Awards winners
Zee Cine Awards winners
Indian Hindus